Sabine Hark (born 7 August 1962 in Nonnweiler) is a German feminist and sociologist, and sits on the editorial board of the journal Feministische Studien (Feminist Studies).

Education 
She studied sociology and political science at Mainz and Frankfurt am Main. She received her doctorate from the Free University of Berlin in 1995.

Career 
From 1997 until 2005 she has taught "sociology of gender" at the University of Potsdam. Since 2009 she has been director of "The center for interdisciplinary women's and gender's studies" at the Technical University of Berlin. A central part of her research is the deconstruction of lesbianism with respect to feminine identity.

Selected bibliography

Books 
 
Book review:

Chapters in books 
 
From the original book in English:

Journal articles

References

External links 
 Sabine Hark's Website at the center for interdisciplinary women's and gender's studies 

1962 births
Academic journal editors
Free University of Berlin alumni
German feminists
German sociologists
German women academics
Goethe University Frankfurt alumni
Living people
Academic staff of the Technical University of Berlin
Johannes Gutenberg University Mainz alumni
Academic staff of the University of Potsdam
German women sociologists
Gender studies academics